Alma May Waterman (1893-1977) was an American botanist, mycologist, and plant pathologist noted for studying diseases of shade and ornamental trees, as well as diseases of roses.

Works

References 

1893 births
1977 deaths
American women scientists
American botanists
American mycologists
American phytopathologists
Women phytopathologists
American women botanists
20th-century American women
20th-century American people
20th-century agronomists